Edward L. G. "Ted" Bowell (born 1943 in London), is an American astronomer. Bowell was educated at Emanuel School London, University College, London, and the University of Paris.

He was principal investigator of the Lowell Observatory Near-Earth-Object Search (LONEOS). He has discovered a large number of asteroids, both as part of LONEOS and in his own right before LONEOS began. Among the latter are the Jovian asteroids 2357 Phereclos, 2759 Idomeneus, 2797 Teucer, 2920 Automedon, 3564 Talthybius, 4057 Demophon, and (4489) 1988 AK. He also co-discovered the periodic comet 140P/Bowell-Skiff and the non-periodic comet C/1980 E1.

The outer main-belt asteroid 2246 Bowell was named in his honor. The official naming citation was published on 1 January 1981.

List of discovered minor planets 

Edward Bowell discovered 571 minor planets.

References

External links 
 Edward "Ted" Bowell , Lowell Observatory

1943 births
20th-century  American  astronomers
Alumni of University College London
Discoverers of asteroids
Discoverers of comets

Living people
People educated at Emanuel School
University of Paris alumni
British expatriates in France
British emigrants to the United States